Julio Bagué (born January 17, 1968 in San Juan, Puerto Rico) is a producer, arranger and music executive. Bagué has received multiple Latin Grammy Award nominations, and won a Latin Grammy Award for Best Traditional Tropical Album for his work with Jon Secada featuring The Charlie Sepúlveda Big Band on the recording To Beny Moré with Love. Bagué is also known for signing, developing and promoting Latin music artists internationally in his capacity as a Vice President of US Latin East Coast and Puerto Rico for peermusic. Bagué has been with this independent, multi-national music publishing firm for nearly two decades.

Early life
Bagué began his music career at the age of seven, perfecting his violin playing and making early attempts at composing. He was later mentored by maestro Carlos Varela, a graduate from the Juilliard School of Music who worked as an arranger/orchestrator in the jazz, Latin and classical fields with artists such as Louie Armstrong, Count Basie and Arturo Toscanini. Bagué graduated with a master's degree in Music from the University of Miami in 1993.

Career

1990s: Music industry beginnings
His career as a producer and composer began with film scores for award-winning director Brendan Fraser, as well as various jingles and spots for such clients as Radio Disney and Bacardi. By 1993, Bagué had been songwriting and arranging with Miami-based jazz musician, Laura Bradley, and collaborating with Néstor Torres, Exposé and Tito Puente.

He later went on to compose music for theater and ballet, receiving excellent reviews in venues including Coconut Grove Playhouse, The Colony Theater and Juegos del Arte Dance Ensemble. With music culled from these works, Bagué creating two albums as a recording artist (Origin and Caribbean Dream) on the Alcione Music label. Origin received great acceptance in France, as the title track was used as the official song celebrating the eclipse of 1999. The song "Ceiba" from Caribbean Dream was the theme song for the television series "En Ruta Por..." in Puerto Rico, and was also utilized as the promotional campaign spot for the island's "Jardin Botanico de Caguas" botanical garden.

From 1996-1999, Bague worked with internationally renowned composer/producer Alejandro Jaen as arranger, songwriter and producer. His first foray into music publishing was assisting Jaen as a song plugger when he created the Ventura Music publishing company. During this time with Jaen, he worked on artist projects such as Menudo/MDO, Ommar Hernandez, and Flamenco icon Peret.

2022-2017: Peermusic and Music Production

This 2022 Julio Bagué is recording the music for the film about the life of Joe Arroyo ¨Rebelión¨ and he has produced the album ¨Ella¨ with Daniela Padron and Glenda del E released by Oleta Music, this album is a tribute to the latin american writers. 

In 2021 Bagué found the independent record label Oleta Music, which first álbum to release ¨Solos¨ with Jon Secada and Gonzalo Rubalcaba was nominated for a Latin Grammy and it was produced by Bagué. 

In 2000, Bagué was named Creative Manager for peermusic, the largest privately owned music publisher in the world. In 2003, Bagué was promoted to newly created position of East Coast Creative Director of peermusic's U.S. Latin division, and assigned to handle creative affairs for Puerto Rico. As Creative Director, his skills led him to develop talent such as the duo "Bacha,” composed of members Jorge Luis Chacin and Juliana Barrios. Bagué produced and arranged their self-titled album which was nominated for a Latin Grammy Award in 2005. In 2006, Bagué served on the judging panel for peermusic's third annual Latin Scholarship for original Latin songs and instrumental compositions, which was awarded to Berklee College of Music student, Marco A. Godoy.

Bagué took over operations for peermusic's Miami office in 2009. During this period, the company acquired the PMC and Ventura Music catalogs and signed Sony recording artists Víctor Manuelle and Chayanne to worldwide music publishing agreements. Bagué produced and signed to the US Latin Grammy nominated artists ChocQuibTown, and Tropical recording artists, Melina León and Carolina la O. Bagué was named peermusic's Executive Director - Miami and Puerto Rico in 2012. He produced Cofresí, the operetta by composer Rafael Hernández that immortalizes the renowned Puerto Rican pirate, Roberto Cofresí. The album was released in 2013 after an extensive two year reconstruction of a  Latin music masterpiece thought to be lost, and was nominated for a Latin Grammy that year in the Best Classical Album category. Additionally, the recording was awarded a cultural patronage of Puerto Rico by UNESCO.

In 2014, Bagué was promoted to Vice President of peermusic's Latin Division, for the East Coast and Puerto Rico. Three years later, Bagué won a Latin Grammy Award for his work as producer of the album To Beny Moré with Love, a tribute by Jon Secada featuring the Charlie Sepúlveda Big Band to the legendary Cuban singer and bandleader, Beny Moré.

During his career, Bagué has been responsible for signing top artist/songwriters, including Grammy Award-winning artist Gilberto Santa Rosa. He also added his personal touch as a producer/arranger on projects including Salsa superstar Carolina La O; Puerto Rican Merengue diva, Melina León; Latin Jazz trumpet virtuoso Charlie Sepúlveda and Reggaeton/Urban artist, Naldo. Bagué currently serves on the advisory boards for Musicians on Call, The Latin Songwriters Hall of Fame and St. Martha-Yamaha Concert Series.

Awards and honors 
In 2019, Julio Bagué win the Latin Grammy for Best Tropical album with ¨Tiempo Al Tiempo¨ from Luis Enrique and C4 Trio for his work as producer and the Grammy nomination in 2020 for this album, also is named by the Billboard magazine as Latin Power Player.

In 2017, Bagué won a Latin Grammy Award in the category of Best Traditional Tropical Album for his work as a producer on the album To Beny Moré with Love. A homage piece to the late great Cuban bandleader singer-songwriter Beny Moré, it was interpreted by Grammy award winner Jon Secada, featuring the Charlie Sepúlveda Big Band.

As album producer for Cofresí: Rafael Hernández, Bagué received a Latin Grammy nomination for Best Classical Album in 2013.

Bagué received three 2012 Latin Grammy nominations for his work with Colombian recording artists, ChocQuibTown. Bagué produced Eso Es Lo Que Hay, which was nominated for Album of the Year and Best Alternative Music Album, including the song "Calentura," nominated for Record Of The Year.

Bagué produced and arranged the self-titled album for the duo of Jorge Luis Chacín and Juliana Barrios, known as "Bachá." The album was nominated for a Latin Grammy for Best Contemporary Tropical Album in 2005.

Other ventures

Philanthropy and Community
Julio Bagué is a board member of nonprofit organization, The Miami Foundation for a Greater Miami. Established in 1967, the Foundation manages $360 million in donor assets and has awarded almost $300 million in grants towards programs designed to enhance the quality of life in Miami. Additionally, Bagué currently serves on the advisory board for Musicians on Call and on the board of governors for St. Martha-Yamaha Concert Series. He is Board Member of the Recording Academy for the Florida Chapter and Chairman in the Advocacy Comite and also He is part of the Latin Hall Of Fame comite.

Public speaking
In June 2014, Bagué was the feature guest speaker at Full Sail University in Winter Park, Florida, where he spoke about his career in the music industry and the state of Latin music at that time. Bagué has also spoken at several Music Business and Songwriting panels for the Frost School of Music at the University of Miami campus and was a guest Songwriting panelist at Miami Dade Community College.

Discography 
Selected List of Credits

Filmography

See also
 18th Annual Latin Grammy Awards - Best Traditional Tropical Album (won)
 14th Annual Latin Grammy Awards - Best Classical Album (nomination)
 13th Annual Latin Grammy Awards - Record of the Year, Album of the Year, Best Alternative Music Album (nominations)
 6th Annual Latin Grammy Awards - Best Contemporary Tropical Album (nomination)

References

External links
 Peermusic Senior Personnel
 

1968 births
Living people
Latin Grammy Award winners
People from San Juan, Puerto Rico
Puerto Rican male composers
Puerto Rican musicians
University of Miami Frost School of Music alumni
Puerto Rican record producers
Latin music record producers
American music industry executives
Music arrangers